The Golden Beast is a 1926 mystery thriller novel by the British writer E. Phillips Oppenheim. Oppenheim was prolific, bestselling author whose popularity reached its height during the interwar years. The novel was published in America by  Little, Brown.

Synopsis
After the accidental death of his son, Lord Honerton forcefully secures the execution of the gamekeeper who had struck him after objecting to his making love to his daughter. A curse seems to fall on the family, owners of a Norfolk country estate, and many years later the youngest son of the family disappears without trace - baffling the efforts of Scotland Yard to find him.

References

Bibliography
 Reilly, John M. Twentieth Century Crime & Mystery Writers. Springer, 2015.
 Server, Lee. Encyclopedia of Pulp Fiction Writers. Infobase Publishing, 2014. 
 Standish, Robert. The Prince of Storytellers: The Life of E. Phillips Oppenheim. P. Davies, 1957.

External links
 

1926 British novels
Novels by E. Phillips Oppenheim
British thriller novels
British mystery novels
Hodder & Stoughton books
Novels set in Norfolk
Little, Brown and Company books